Daniel Sanders (November 12, 1819, StrelitzMarch 11, 1897, Strelitz) was a German lexicographer of Jewish parentage. He is famous for lexicons and dictionaries (Der Große Muret Sanders).

Biography and bibliography 
Sanders received an elementary education in his local Jewish school and went on to the Gymnasium Carolinum in the neighbouring city of Neustrelitz.   From there he moved to the universities of Berlin and Halle to study classical and modern languages, mathematics, and natural history, leaving with a doctorate in philosophy.  From 1842 to 1852, he was a school teacher at his own former elementary school in Altstrelitz.

In 1852 Sanders began a detailed response to Grimm's Deutsches Wörterbuch - of which he was very critical - leading to the publication of his own dictionary of the German language, Wörterbuch der Deutschen Sprache published from 1859 to 1865. This was followed by his Ergänzungswörterbuch der Deutschen Sprache (1878–1885).  Among others of his works in the same field are Fremdwörterbuch (1871), Wörterbuch der Hauptschwierigkeiten in der Deutschen Sprache (1872) and Lehrbuch der Deutschen Sprache für Schulen in 3 Stufen (1888). Sanders laid down his views in his Katechismus der Deutschen Orthographie (1856) and was an active member of the orthographical conference in Berlin in 1876.

Sanders also published a translation in verse of the Song of Songs (1866), and wrote some poems titled Heitere Kinderwelt (1868).  In 1887 he founded the Zeitschrift fur die Deutsche Sprache, which he edited almost until his death at Altstrelitz in the spring of 1897.

References

External links 

1819 births
1897 deaths
19th-century German Jews
German lexicographers
People from Mecklenburg-Strelitz
Humboldt University of Berlin alumni
Martin Luther University of Halle-Wittenberg alumni
German male non-fiction writers
19th-century lexicographers